Gert-Jan Theunisse (born 14 January 1963) is a Dutch former road bicycle racer. He won the 1988 edition of the Clásica San Sebastián one-day race. In the 1989 Tour de France, he won the King of the Mountains competition.

Biography

Theunisse turned professional in 1984 with the Panasonic cycling team. That year he finished third in the Ronde van Nederland and had places of honour in races such as the Grand Prix de Fourmies and the Grand Prix d'Isbergues in 1986. However it was not until 1988 that he achieved great success. In the 1988 Tour de France he challenged his former teammate, Pedro Delgado. However he tested positive for testosterone and received a 10-minute penalty which moved him from fourth to 11th overall. Theunisse returned the following year and won the mountains classification and the stage up Alpe d'Huez in the 1989 Tour de France .

In 1990 he also tested positive in the Flèche Wallonne and Bicicleta Vasca. He abandoned the second stage of the 1995 Tirreno–Adriatico and stopped his career after receiving medical advice for heart trouble. He began advising Mario Gutte and then mountain biker Bart Brentjens from late 1995. The following year he drew up a training scheme for Brentjens for the 1996 Atlanta Olympic Games. Brentjens won the Dutch national championship, the world championship, the World Cup, the Tour de France VTT and then gold at the Olympic Games. Brentjens signed with the Specialized Mountain Bike team at the end of 1996 and stipulated in the contract that Theunisse would be team manager.

During this time, Theunisse rode occasional regional mountain bike races. On 8 September 1997 he was hit by a car while training with the team. He was diagnosed as having a paraplegia, the result of a spinal cord injury when the car hit him. Theunisse was unable to walk but recovered over the six months and returned to coaching the Specialized team. In January 1999, he won a mountain bike race in the United Kingdom but could not walk for three days afterwards. In June 1999 he had a heart attack. In 2000 he admitted using illegal substances but denied taking testosterone.

Theunisse continued working with Specialized until the sponsor left the sport at the end of 2001. Theunisse then moved to Majorca, where he began riding his mountain bike 150 km a day. He won the European over-30 championship in 2002. He competed from 2003 to 2005 despite consistent pain due to spinal damage, difficulty walking straight as well as involuntary muscle or spastic attacks. Theunisse had twelve wins as an active Mountain bike cyclist. Theunisse was sponsored by PowerPlate-Giant and concentrated on the mountain bike marathons of the World and European championships.

Theunisse rode his final mountain bike race in October 2005 at a race at Scheveningen, Netherlands and discussed plans to build a sports centre for disabled competitors. Theunisse is said to be 13 per cent handicapped and aims to compete in the Paralympics.

Major results

1984
 3rd Overall Ronde van Nederland
1st Stage 7 (TTT)
 6th Züri-Metzgete
 8th Kuurne–Brussels–Kuurne
 10th Overall Étoile de Bessèges
1986
 2nd Grand Prix de Fourmies
 3rd Grand Prix d'Isbergues
 5th Overall Ronde van Nederland
 6th Brabantse Pijl
1987
 4th Road race, National Road Championships
 7th Overall Ronde van Nederland
1988 
 1st Clásica de San Sebastián
 9th Tour of Flanders
1989 
 1st  Overall Vuelta a Asturias
1st Stage 6
 4th Overall Tour de France
1st  Mountains classification
1st Stage 17 
 4th Overall Tour de Trump
1st Stage 4 
 6th Baden-Baden (with Steven Rooks)
 7th Clásica de San Sebastián
1990
 3rd La Flèche Wallonne 
 4th Overall Settimana Internazionale di Coppi e Bartali 
 8th Liège–Bastogne–Liège
1991 
 1st  Overall Tour de Luxembourg
1st Stage 1
 1st  Overall Vuelta a los Valles Mineros
 2nd Road race, National Road Championships
1992 
 1st Stage 3a Tour de Luxembourg
 2nd Overall Critérium International
 7th Liège–Bastogne–Liège
 10th Amstel Gold Race
1993 
 6th Wincanton Classic
 8th Amstel Gold Race
 8th La Flèche Wallonne
 8th Veenendaal–Veenendaal
 9th Overall Four Days of Dunkirk
1994
 2nd Road race, National Road Championships
1999
 1st Egmond-pier-Egmond

Grand Tour general classification results timeline

See also
 List of doping cases in cycling

Notes

References

External links
Official website
 
Palmarès by museociclismo.it  

1963 births
Living people
Dutch male cyclists
Dutch Tour de France stage winners
Dutch sportspeople in doping cases
Doping cases in cycling
Sportspeople from Oss
Cyclists from North Brabant
20th-century Dutch people